The Myodini are a tribe of forest voles in the subfamily Arvicolinae. Species in this tribe are:

Tribe Myodini
Genus Alticola - voles from Central Asia
Subgenus Alticola
White-tailed mountain vole, A. albicauda
Silver mountain vole, A. argentatus
Gobi Altai mountain vole, A. barakshin
Central Kashmir vole, A. montosa
Royle's mountain vole, A. roylei
Mongolian silver vole, A. semicanus
Stolička's mountain vole, A. stoliczkanus
Tuva silver vole, A. tuvinicus
Subgenus Aschizomys
Lemming vole, A. lemminus
Large-eared vole, A. macrotis
Lake Baikal mountain vole, A. olchonensis
Subgenus Platycranius
Flat-headed vole, 'A. strelzowi
Genus Caryomys
Ganzu vole, C. eva
Kolan vole, C. inez
Genus Eothenomys - voles from East Asia
Kachin red-backed vole, E. cachinus
Pratt's vole, E. chinensis
Southwest China vole, E. custos
Père David's vole, E. melanogaster
Yunnan red-backed vole, E. miletus
Chaotung vole, E. olitor
Yulungshan vole, E. proditor
Ward's red-backed vole, E. wardi
Genus Hyperacrius - voles from Pakistan
True's vole, H. fertilis
Murree vole, H. wynnei
Genus Myodes - red-backed voles
Anderson's red-backed vole, M. andersoni
Western red-backed vole, M. californicus
Tien Shan red-backed vole, M. centralis
Southern red-backed vole, M. gapperi
Bank vole, M. glareolus
Imaizumi's red-backed vole, M. imaizumii
Korean red-backed vole, M. regulus
Hokkaido red-backed vole, M. rex
Grey red-backed vole, M. rufocanus
Northern red-backed vole, M. rutilus
Shansei vole, M. shanseius
Smith's vole, M. smithii

References

 
Taxa named by Miklós Kretzoi
Mammal tribes